Paul Gladon (born 18 March 1992) is a Dutch professional footballer who plays as forward for Fortuna Sittard.

He previously played in the Netherlands for Sparta Rotterdam, FC Dordrecht and Heracles Almelo respectively before a short stay with English side Wolverhampton Wanderers. He subsequently played on loan for Belgian club Sint-Truiden before returning to the Netherlands where he played for Groningen, Willem II and Emmen.

Career
Gladon started playing football as a six-year-old at the local football club SV Hoofddorp, where he played until reaching the under-17 team. He then went on to play for the under-19 side of Sparta Rotterdam, led by coach Arjan van der Laan. In November 2010, he made his debut with Jong Sparta in an away match against Jong Ajax, and in January 2011 he made his debut in the first-team squad, in the derby against Feyenoord, which was also the last matchup for the Rotterdam Silver Ball. He signed a professional contract with Sparta until mid-2015. While on loan at Dordrecht from the club, Gladon scored a 19-minute hat-trick for against Volendam on 8 March 2014.

On 26 August 2016, he moved from Heracles Almelo to English Championship club Wolverhampton Wanderers on a three-year deal (with the option of a further year) for an undisclosed fee. He made his club debut on 10 September 2016 in a 1–1 draw with Burton Albion.

On 29 June 2017, after only making three appearances in all competitions for Wolves, he re-joined his former club Heracles Almelo on a season-long loan.

At the start of the following season, by which time Wolves had been promoted to the Premier League, Gladon still remained outside of their first team plans. Instead, he moved to Belgium First Division side Sint-Truiden on loan in a move scheduled to last until the end of the season. However, he failed to break into the side and made just one league appearance as a substitute.

In January 2019, after not having featured for Wolves since September 2016, Gladon's contract with the club was terminated by mutual consent.

On 16 January, he agreed a deal with Dutch club Groningen for the remainder of the season. Eight months later, on 7 August 2019, Gladon signed a two-year contract with Willem II.

Gladon signed a six-month contract with Emmen on 1 February 2021, after having terminated his contract with Willem II by mutual consent. He made his debut for the club on 6 February 2021 in a 0–1 loss to AZ.

Career statistics

References

External links
 
 

1992 births
Living people
People from Haarlemmermeer
Dutch footballers
Association football forwards
Sparta Rotterdam players
Heracles Almelo players
FC Dordrecht players
Wolverhampton Wanderers F.C. players
Sint-Truidense V.V. players
FC Groningen players
Willem II (football club) players
FC Emmen players
Eredivisie players
Eerste Divisie players
Belgian Pro League players
English Football League players
Dutch expatriate footballers
Expatriate footballers in England
Dutch expatriate sportspeople in England
Expatriate footballers in Belgium
Dutch expatriate sportspeople in Belgium
Footballers from North Holland